The World Military Pentathlon Championship are the world championships of military pentathlon organized every year by International Military Sports Council (CISM) from 1950.

Editions and champions

See also

Military pentathlon
Military World Games

Notes

References

External links
Page of the World Military Pentathlon Championship from official site of CISM

Pentathlon